Whitney Reynolds (born April 3, 1986) is an American television talk show host, media personality, podcast host author, producer, and philanthropist. She hosts The Whitney Reynolds Show, a nationally syndicated talk show that airs on PBS stations across the United States.

She also has a segment, titled Whitney’s Women, on iHeart Radio’s “The Weekly Show" that features women from the Chicago area who "Give Back." She also serves as a board member for Dress For Success.

Education 
Originally from Durant, Oklahoma, Reynolds attended Durant High School from the year 2000–2004.

She anchored her high school TV channel, hosting Baylor's half time radio update.

Reynolds frequently gives back to her hometown.

When she was in the 10th grade, Reynolds went to New York City to visit morning news programs on the three days she was in town. When it was time to head to GMA, she met an intern that attended Baylor University, a school she would attend in the future.

Reynolds went on to further her education at Baylor University to obtain a Bachelor of Arts in Communications (2004–2007). Reynolds was engaged in numerous extracurricular activities at Baylor University such as Pi Beta Phi, PBP-Oklahoma Rush Leader, YMCA Camp Counselor, and Habitat for Humanity. Throughout her college years, she worked at Baylor Athletics as a Video Assistant and Bears Radio Announcer.

Early television career 

While Reynolds was graduating from Baylor University, that intern she met during trip to New York City in the 10th grade still worked on GMA. The intern ended up submitting her resume to the intern supervisor, thus securing Whitney’s career starting internship with the television show Good Morning America post college. 

Upon completion of the Good Morning America internship, at the age of 21, Reynolds worked as a reporter and producer at a KTEN Television, an NBC station outside of Dallas, Texas.

Within three months, Reynolds became an anchor of their morning show. After just over a year at KTEN Television, she left to pursue new opportunities.

Reynolds then moved to Chicago and began her career at WREX where she would film, edit, and report news on a daily story.

Before she started working, she negotiated into her contract that if a small talk show that she started got picked up, she would be allowed to end her contract. After her small talk show gained traction, NBC bought what would become Weekends with Whitney. 

That new show ran for about a year in Chicago, where she went around Chicago trying new restaurants, tasting wine, and even skydiving. Reynolds then decided she wasn't as compelled by “around-the-town" pieces, but become more interested in delving into serious topics and looking at them from multiple perspectives due to experiences of her upbringing.

The Whitney Reynolds Show 
Reynolds always knew that she wanted to have her television show. As a child, she started interviewing her friends with a makeshift microphone in her living room. During her adolescence, her family's difficult personal journey gave her the desire to share delicate stories that must be told. At the age of 23, her childhood dream became her adult mission and her talk show was born.

Reynolds established The Whitney Reynolds Show. The show discusses a single topic from multiple perspectives. Topics include but are not limited to military veterans, survived hardships, illnesses and stories of hope. Some notable guests to discuss relevant issues on the show include Chelsea Handler, Michael Phelps, Magic Johnson, & Temple Grandin.

Within the first year, the show captivated NBC, and Reynolds had the opportunity to move the show onto their station. In 2012, Reynolds moved The Whitney Reynolds Show to the PBS Network to broadcast in Chicago's Lakeshore PBS,  The Quad Cities' WQPT and Peoria's WTVP.

As the success of the show kept building, in 2015, The Whitney Reynolds Show got nominated for its first Emmy in the category: Outstanding Interview and Discussion Special Programming. Whitney has the honor of presenting at the award ceremony.

In that same year, Lakeshore Public Television added The Whitney Reynolds Show to their network. Reynolds now could reach 3.5 million viewers across the Region.

The Whitney Reynolds Show has often been praised for its mass appeal as the show continues to expand on its markets and has stayed true to its mission. Reynolds new seasons can be seen on PBS and also her YouTube channel.

Season 9 of The Whitney Reynolds Show premiered in Fall of 2018.

The show expanded its market on July 7, 2019, with the addition of WILL Champaign-Urbana. Not only did the show expand its market, But The Whitney Reynolds Show also expanded the crew and their roles. In addition to market expansions, The Whitney Reynolds Show has started streaming on Amazon and streaming nationally on PBS. The show is now in areas across the US, 6 states in total.

During the Fall of 2019, The Whitney Reynolds Show began streaming on PBS Video App.

As of January 2021, the show will be offered to PBS stations nationwide through the National Educational Telecommunications Association distribution service.

After the show reached nationwide status,The Whitney Reynolds Show kicked off its second season that is broadcast nationally during October 2021.

For Season 4, The Whitney Reynolds Show is available on a variety of streaming services including Apple TV+, Tubi, Amazon Prime Video, and the Binge Network.

As of March 2023, The Whitney Reynolds Show is recorded at CineCity Studios in Chicago in front of a live audience.

Whitney's Women 
Reynolds is the founder and executive of the radio segment Whitney's Women which airs on "The Weekly Show" on 103.5 KISS FM, 95.5 BIG, 93.9 MYfm and iHeart Radio. She also has a column for Whitney's Women in Chicago Woman Magazine which features Chicago women that give back to the community.

In 2016, she took this concept to print and is available in every issue of Chicago Woman Magazine.

Due to the praise of Whitney's Women, Reynolds was recognized as a Humanitarian Honoree at the FAHF Awards for this segment.

The Pop and Positivity Podcast 
On March 6, 2021, Reynolds began co-hosting The Pop and Positivity Podcast based on love and passion for positivity. The podcast features celebrity guests such as Ava Max, Afrojack, Bella Thorne, Jax, and Mark Wahlberg.

The podcast covers a variety of topics that are personal to each guest featured on the podcast, such as being in the public eye. The intent of the podcast is to allow listeners to understand how being a celebrity and creating positivity go hand in hand.

Beyond the Interviews: A 52 Week Guide of Inspiration 
Reynolds wrote a book, Beyond the Interviews: A 52 Week Guide of Inspiration, influenced by the most powerful interviews of the last eight seasons of The Whitney Reynolds Show.

Hosting & Appearances 
On September 18, 2022, Reynolds hosted the 54th Annual Public Media Awards. The Public Media Awards Gala was presented by the National Educational Telecommunications Association honoring the achievements of public media.

Reynolds was guest speaker for the 2022 Women of Influence event put on by Peoria Magazine. The event was held on December 6, 2022, in Peoria, Illinois.

Also in December, 2022, Reynolds was a featured guest on Daytime Chicago for the WGN Holiday Special discussing “Whitney’s Wish List: The 2022 Curated Holiday Gift Guide”.  The guide was featured on her website, whitneyreynolds.com.

Philanthropy 

Reynolds consistently participates in charity events for multiple causes.

She was deemed a Humanitarian Nominee for We Dream in Color, a charity that puts on events in collaboration with other organizations for fundraising for select causes. Also, Reynolds was the keynote speaker for the 2019 Legacy and Legends gathering for members of the Five Junior League.

In 2022, Reynolds attended the 45th anniversary of the Ronald McDonald House Charities of Chicagoland & Northwest Indiana gala to support access to arts education by providing tuition-free arts training programs for current, future, and former students at The Chicago High School for the Arts. The event raised over $500,000 in one night.

For 2023, Reynolds is a featured co-chair and member of the Service Club of Chicago. She will help host the annual Spring Hat Luncheon. The event will support the nonprofit’s Philanthropic Grant Program, which awards grants to other charities to help them expand facilities, improve equipment, and initiate new programs.

Over the years, Reynolds has helped in fundraising over 2 million dollars for local and global charities through her philanthropic efforts.

Awards & Honors 
Reynolds along with her television show has garnered several awards throughout its ongoing run.

She was recognized as a Humanitarian Honoree at the FAHF Awards and Female Leader of The Year at the "I'm Possible Conference" for the contributions her show gives to society.

In 2015, The Whitney Reynolds Show got nominated for its first Emmy in the category: Outstanding Interview and Discussion Special Programming.

In November 2019, Reynolds won a Bronze Stevie Award for Video of the Year for the first episode of the ninth episode of The Whitney Reynolds Show titled "Self Image".

On May 27, 2020, The Whitney Reynolds Show earned a bronze at the Telly Awards. The winning episode, "Overcoming Racism", focused on racism in the United States.

During the 2022 Award Season, The Whitney Reynolds Show earned Gold People’s Telly in the General Regional TV Category for the episode titled “Survivors”.  For the Television General Public Interest/Awareness category, the show earned a Bronze Telly for the episode “Did You Know”.

Personal life 
In 2012, Reynolds met her now husband, David Heiner, at a Caribou Coffee in Lakeview, Chicago. They met the day before Whitney pitched her show to PBS. The couple dated for less than six months and they were engaged.

On November 2, 2013, Reynolds and Heiner wed at the West Loop's Soul City Church in Chicago. The couple's wedding was broadcast as a two-hour special on I Do, Chicago Style a show on CANTV.

In 2016, Reynolds gave birth to twins. Reynolds and her family currently reside in Chicago.

References

External links 
 
 

1986 births
Living people
American media personalities
American television producers
American television talk show hosts
American women philanthropists
American women writers
Baylor University alumni
American women television producers
21st-century American women